Sean Hargan (born 6 November 1974 in Derry, Northern Ireland) was a veteran defender who played for Derry City and Crusaders, Hargan retired at the end of 2009 with Crusaders. One of the veterans of the Derry City 1996–97 league-winning side, Hargan continued to play an integral part for the Candystripes and had his testimonial year in 2005, before moving to Crusaders at the end of 2008. Hargan is well renowned for his away goal against IFK Göteborg in the UEFA Cup in 2006, which sparked a magical European campaign for the Candystripes culminating in a tie against french giants, Paris Saint Germain.

Derry City

As a youngster Sean played for Top of the Hill Celtic F.C. in the Derry and District League. As he got older he broke into the Derry City team in the position of striker and scored a hat trick on his debut. Hargan later converted to left back, where he offers total commitment to the side. This has endeared him to the fans. Hargan has scored more than 50 competitive goals for the Candystripes, including a decisive header away to IFK Gothenburg in the 2006 UEFA Cup qualifying round. Also during the 2006 league season, Derry City escaped punishment for fielding a banned Hargan due to the league failing informing Derry City in the correct timeframe. By the end of that season, Hargan had made a total of 393 appearances for the club - that makes him the club's third highest appearer ever. Hargan was described as a great servant for the club and is mostly remembered for the goal he scored in the Europa League against IFK Gothenburg which saw Derry to a 1–0 victory on the night. After Derry's City's European experience, Shelbourne were reported to have shown interest in the left back, but Hargan pledged his loyalty and stayed with the Candystripes until the end of the 2008 season.

With the signing of Dave Rogers at the beginning of the 2007 season, Hargan's first-team place came under stiff competition. Nevertheless, due to his senior status in the team he was handed the role of vice-captain to Peter Hutton by Pat Fenlon for the season and Hargan seen off the completion of Rodgers until he sustained an injury that would keep him out for the rest of the season.
Hargan signed for a Crusaders at the end of that season after departing the Brandywell club after 14 years at the club.

Hargan was appointed the First Team Coach at Derry City following the appointment of Peter Hutton as manager in 2014.

Crusaders

At the end of December 2008, Irish League side Crusaders signed Hargan on an 18-month deal. Dungannon Swifts and Coleraine were also believed to be interested in the veteran full-back, but Hargan signed for the Crues and spent just under a year as his career was cut short due to injury. Hargan retired from professional football at the end of the 2009 season at the age of 37.

References

External links
 Player Profile - Official Derry City site

1974 births
Living people
Association footballers from Northern Ireland
Derry City F.C. players
League of Ireland players
Crusaders F.C. players
NIFL Premiership players
Association football defenders